Bjørg Andersen (born 15 June 1942) is a Norwegian handball player, who played for the clubs Skjeberg IF, Østsiden IL and Lisleby FK. She played 143 matches on the Norway women's national handball team from 1960 to 1977. She participated at the 1971, 1973 and 1975 World Women's Handball Championships.

She is the mother of football manager Jørn Andersen and grandmother of former Werder Bremen player Niklas Andersen.

References

1942 births
Living people
Norwegian female handball players